John Henninger Reagan (1818–1905) was an American politician.

John Reagan may also refer to:

 John Reagan, character in Alias Mary Flynn
 Johnny Reagan (1926–2018), baseball coach
 Jack Reagan (1883–1941), father of Ronald Reagan
 John Neil Reagan (1908–1996), American radio station manager
 John Reagan (New Hampshire politician) (born 1946), New Hampshire politician

See also
 John Regan (disambiguation)